Are You My Brother? is a Singaporean TV series produced by MediaCorp in 1999.

Main cast
Tay Ping Hui
Thomas Ong
Huang Biren
Pan Lingling
Yvonne Lim
Jacelyn Tay

Synopsis
Chang Lee sells chicken at a wet market, and found out during a blood test for a bone marrow donation that he and a man named Dong Cheng are brothers. Dong Cheng, who only wanted to donate bone marrow as a way to seal the deal on a contract, had a hard time to accept his biological family works at a wet market for a living.

References
Official Website (in Simplified Chinese)
Program listing on Toggle.sg

Singapore Chinese dramas
1999 Singaporean television series debuts